Kehewin 123 is an Indian reserve of the Kehewin Cree Nation in Alberta, located within the Municipal District of Bonnyville No. 87. It is 20 kilometers south of Bonnyville.

Geography 
The locality of Kehewin is on the Kehewin 123 reserve.

Demographics 
In the 2016 Canadian Census, it recorded a population of 976 living in 233 of its 256 total private dwellings.

Economy 
The unemployment rate as of 2022 was approximately 30%. and average incomes among those with full-time work are approximately $12,000 lower than the provincial average.

Education 
This reserve has a 95.5% high school completion rate, in comparison to the average secondary schooling rate of 88%.

References

Indian reserves in Alberta